Skylines may refer to

 Skylines (film), a 2020 science fiction action film
 Skylines (TV series), a 2019 German drama series
 Skylines (album), a 2005 album by Scott Liss
 Cities: Skylines, a 2015 city-building video game
 Cities: Skylines II, the sequel to the above video game set to be released in 2023

See also 
 Skyline (disambiguation)
 Skyliner (disambiguation)
 Skyliners (disambiguation)